Franz Seldte (29 June 18821 April 1947) was a German politician who served as the Reich Minister for Labour from 1933 to 1945. Prior to his ministry, Seldte served as the Federal Leader of Der Stahlhelm World War I ex-servicemen's organisation from 1918 to 1934. Ideologically, he identified as a national conservative.

Early life and education
Born in Magdeburg in the Prussian province of Saxony, Seldte was the son of an owner of a factory producing chemical products and soda water. He attended the Wilhelm-Raabe-Gymnasium in Magdeburg and, after an apprenticeship as a salesman, studied chemistry at the universities of Braunschweig and Greifswald. In 1908 he took over the business of his early deceased father. As an officer of the German Army he was wounded in World War I and lost his left arm. He then became a front reporter. Awarded with the Iron Cross 2nd and 1st class, Seldte also was promoted to the rank of Hauptmann d.R. in the 66th Infantry Regiment.

Der Stahlhelm

As a reaction to the German Revolution of 1918–1919, Seldte founded Der Stahlhelm, Bund der Frontsoldaten on 25 December 1918, agitating against the Treaty of Versailles and German war reparations. According to Seldte, the organization was to use the spirit of the Frontsoldaten against the 'swinish revolution' taking place in Germany under the Weimar government. While he took charge of Der Stahlhelm from 1923 onwards, he had to cope with the constant rivalry of his deputy leader, the militant Theodor Duesterberg.

Seldte became a member of the national conservative German National People's Party (DNVP) and was a member of the Magdeburg city council (Stadtrat).
During the later years of the Weimar Republic Der Stahlhelm became increasingly anti-democratic and anti-republican. However, Seldte hoped that the organization could become a leading organ of a united right-wing movement. In 1929 it united its forces with the DNVP under Alfred Hugenberg, the Pan-German League and the Nazi Party to initiate a German referendum against the Young Plan on World War I reparations. The common goal was to denounce the Chancellor Hermann Müller and his ministers as traitors to their country, nevertheless the plebiscite failed to reach the quorum. In 1931 Seldte helped create the short-lived Harzburg Front, a right-wing alliance against the government of Müller's successor Heinrich Brüning.

Minister for Labour
During the negotiations for the Chancellorship of Germany between Franz von Papen and Hitler in mid-January 1933, Seldte threw his vote and Der Stahlhelm behind Hitler, after which Papen acquiesced to Hitler's demands. On the day of the Machtergreifung on 30 January 1933, Seldte joined the Hitler Cabinet as Reich Minister for Labour, once again outdoing his long-time rival Duesterberg. In the run-up to the elections of March 1933, Der Stahlhelm together with Hugenberg's national conservative German National People's Party (DNVP) attempted to make the Kampffront Schwarz-Weiß-Rot ("Black White Red Combat Front") into the dominant political camp on the right, but ultimately failed as it only gained 8.0% of the votes cast. Nevertheless, Seldte obtained a seat in the Reichstag parliament as a DNVP "guest".

On 27 April 1933 Seldte finally joined the Nazi Party and merged Der Stahlhelm into Ernst Röhm's Sturmabteilung (SA) militia – de facto placing it at the disposal of Hitler. In August 1933, he was awarded the rank of SA-Obergruppenführer and later was appointed Reichskommissar for the Freiwilliger Arbeitsdienst employment program, but was soon superseded by his state secretary Konstantin Hierl as leader of the Reichsarbeitsdienst organization. Seldte also was made a member of the Academy for German Law. In March 1934 Seldte was made the federal leader of the Nationalsozialistischer Deutscher frontkämpfer-Bund (Stahlhelm) (NSDFBSt), a successor organization of Der Stahlhelm, which however was soon disbanded. In 1935 he requested to be released from official responsibilities, but Hitler refused.

Throughout his tenure as chief of the Labor Ministry, Seldte never enjoyed the full support of Hitler, who did not think he was worth much. As a result, members of the Nazi hierarchy began encroaching on his areas of responsibility and Seldte was marginalized accordingly. For instance, Hermann Goering's Four Year Plan which he began to implement in late 1936, ran roughshod over Seldte's Labor Ministry altogether. Seldte, without substantial power, remained Reich Minister for Labour until the end of World War II and was also a member of the Prussian government under Minister president Hermann Göring as State Labour Minister. Even after Hitler's suicide and the nomination of Grand-Admiral Dönitz as his successor, Seldte kept his post, being accordingly named Labour Minister.

As Reich Minister for Labour, Franz Seldte was one of the signatories of the Work Order Act (Gesetz zur Ordnung der nationalen Arbeit) from 1934, which introduced the Führer principle (Führerprinzip) in factories and significantly restricted the rights of employees.

Death
Seldte was captured and arrested in Mondorf-les-Bains at the end of the war. During the Nuremberg trials, Seldte tried to exonerate himself by claiming that he had stood against the dictatorship of Hitler and that he advocated for a two-chamber system of parliamentary governance. His story was not convincing. Seldte died in a US military hospital in April 1947 at Fürth, before the Nuremberg Tribunal had the chance to formally try him on the charges.

Legacy
In Nazi-era Germany, streets were named after him in several German cities, among them his hometown Magdeburg and Leverkusen. In Forst (Lausitz), the football stadium at the water tower was named Franz-Seldte-Kampfbahn. In Oberhausen, the square behind the main railway station was named after him.

References

Bibliography

 Bracher, Karl D. The German Dictatorship: The Origins, Structure, and Effects of National Socialism. New York: Praeger Publishers, 1970.
 Evans, Richard J. The Third Reich in Power. New York: Penguin, 2006.
 Fischer, Klaus. Nazi Germany: A New History. New York: Continuum, 1995.
 Kershaw, Ian. Hitler: 1889-1936, Hubris. New York: W. W. Norton & Company, 2000.
 Klee, Ernst. Das Personenlexikon zum Dritten Reich. Wer war was vor und nach 1945. Frankfurt-am-Main: Fischer-Taschenbuch-Verlag, 2007.
 Longerich, Peter. Heinrich Himmler. Oxford and New York: Oxford University Press, 2012.
 Mazower, Mark. Hitler's Empire: How the Nazis Ruled Europe. New York: Penguin, 2009.
 Shirer, William L. The Rise and Fall of the Third Reich. New York: MJF Books, 1990, [1959].
 Snyder, Louis L. Encyclopedia of the Third Reich. London: Robert Hale, 1976
 Stackelberg, Roderick. The Routledge Companion to Nazi Germany. New York: Routledge, 2007.
 Taylor, James, and Warren Shaw. Dictionary of the Third Reich. New York: Penguin, 2002.
 Wistrich, Robert S. Who's Who in Nazi Germany. New York: Routledge, 2001.
 Zentner, Christian, and Friedemann Bedürftig, eds. The Encyclopedia of the Third Reich, vol. 2 (M-Z). New York: Macmillan Publishing, 1991.

External links

 
 
 

1882 births
1947 deaths
Burials in Bavaria
German amputees
German anti-communists
German casualties of World War I
German city councillors
German Army personnel of World War I
German monarchists in the German Resistance
German National People's Party politicians
German people of World War II
German people who died in prison custody
German Protestants
International Military Tribunal in Nuremberg
Labor ministers (Germany)
Members of the Academy for German Law
Members of the Reichstag of Nazi Germany
Military personnel from Saxony-Anhalt
Nazi Germany ministers
Nazi Party politicians
Nazis who died in prison custody
Organization founders
People from the Province of Saxony
Politicians from Magdeburg
Prussian politicians
Recipients of the Iron Cross (1914), 1st class
Recipients of the Iron Cross (1914), 2nd class
Stahlhelm members
20th-century German businesspeople
University of Greifswald alumni
Prisoners who died in United States military detention